Apatelodes is a genus of moths of the family Apatelodidae first described by Packard in 1864.

Species

 Apatelodes adrastia Druce, 1887
 Apatelodes albipunctata Druce, 1898
 Apatelodes amaryllis Dyar, 1907
 Apatelodes anna (Schaus, 1905)
 Apatelodes ardeola Druce, 1887
 Apatelodes auduboni Wagner & Knudson, 2014
 Apatelodes banepa Druce, 1904
 Apatelodes batima Dyar, 1912
 Apatelodes beneluzi Herbin, 2015
 Apatelodes brueckneri Draudt, 1929
 Apatelodes castanea E. D. Jones, 1908
 Apatelodes cerradensis Herbin & Mielke, 2018
 Apatelodes cerrita Draudt, 1929
 Apatelodes cirna Druce, 1897
 Apatelodes combi Herbin, 2015
 Apatelodes concerpta Draudt, 1929
 Apatelodes corema Schaus, 1895
 Apatelodes damora Schaus, 1939
 Apatelodes datanoides Draudt, 1929
 Apatelodes diana Dognin, 1916
 Apatelodes dianita Dognin, 1921
 Apatelodes doramia Dyar, 1912
 Apatelodes dorrace Herbin & Mielke, 2018
 Apatelodes ennomoides (Walker, 1865)
 Apatelodes erotina Schaus, 1939
 Apatelodes erubescens Draudt, 1929
 Apatelodes faustinoi Herbin & Monzón, 2015
 Apatelodes feiranovensis Herbin & Mielke, 2018
 Apatelodes felisi Herbin, 2015
 Apatelodes firmiana (Stoll, 1782)
 Apatelodes firmianoides Herbin & Mielke, 2018
 Apatelodes garleppi Draudt, 1929
 Apatelodes gaveta (Dognin, 1894)
 Apatelodes gladys Dyar, 1918
 Apatelodes guyanensis Herbin, 2015
 Apatelodes heptaloba Druce, 1887
 Apatelodes hierax Dognin, 1924
 Apatelodes ilia Dognin, 1916
 Apatelodes imparata Dognin, 1907
 Apatelodes infesta Dognin, 1922
 Apatelodes inviolata Dognin, 1911
 Apatelodes jessica Dyar, 1926
 Apatelodes kotzschi Draudt, 1929
 Apatelodes lacetania Druce, 1898
 Apatelodes lapitha Druce, 1900
 Apatelodes lepida Schaus, 1905
 Apatelodes lescamia Dyar, 1912
 Apatelodes martia Stoll, 1782
 Apatelodes mehida Druce, 1904
 Apatelodes merlona Schaus, 1939
 Apatelodes milma Dyar, 1912
 Apatelodes moresca Schaus, 1905
 Apatelodes narda Schaus, 1900
 Apatelodes nina Stoll, 1780
 Apatelodes olaus Schaus, 1924
 Apatelodes palma Druce, 1900
 Apatelodes pandara Druce, 1898
 Apatelodes pandarioides Schaus, 1905
 Apatelodes paraguayana Schaus, 1927
 Apatelodes paratima Schaus, 1910
 Apatelodes parvula Schaus, 1894
 Apatelodes paulista E. D. Jones, 1908
 Apatelodes pertuisa Dognin, 1916
 Apatelodes pervicax Dognin, 1911
 Apatelodes pithala Dognin, 1921
 Apatelodes princeps Dognin, 1911
 Apatelodes pudefacta Dyar, 1904
 Apatelodes quadrata E. D. Jones, 1908
 Apatelodes sadisma Dyar, 1918
 Apatelodes schreiteri Schaus, 1924
 Apatelodes sericea Schaus, 1895
 Apatelodes signata Druce, 1904
 Apatelodes singularis Butler, 1881
 Apatelodes striata Druce, 1906
 Apatelodes sublunulata Schaus, 1920
 Apatelodes taperinha Dognin, 1922
 Apatelodes thinaha Draudt, 1929
 Apatelodes torrefacta Smith, 1797
 Apatelodes tropea Schaus, 1896
 Apatelodes tuisa Schaus, 1910
 Apatelodes turrialba Schaus, 1910
 Apatelodes velutina Schaus, 1895
 Apatelodes verena Druce, 1898
 Apatelodes vistana Schaus, 1939
 Apatelodes xanthapex Draudt, 1929
 Apatelodes zikani Draudt, 1929

References

Apatelodidae
Moth genera